Sir William Newzam Prior Nicholson (5 February 1872 – 16 May 1949) was a British painter of still-life, landscape and portraits. He also worked as a printmaker in techniques including woodcut, wood-engraving and lithography, as an illustrator, as an author of children's books and as a designer for the theatre.

Life
William Nicholson was born in Newark-on-Trent on 5 February 1872, the youngest son of William Newzam Nicholson, an industrialist and Conservative MP of Newark, and his wife Annie Elizabeth Prior, the daughter of Joseph Prior and Elizabeth (née Mallam) of Woodstock, Oxon. From the age of 9 he attended Magnus Grammar School, first as a weekly boarder, later as a day-boy. He had art lessons from the painter, politician and art-master William Cubley of Newark-on-Trent, who had been a pupil of Sir William Beechey, in turn a pupil of Sir Joshua Reynolds. He was briefly a student at Hubert von Herkomer's art school, where he met his future wife Mabel Pryde (1871–1918), who introduced him to her brother James Pryde (1866–1941). From the autumn of 1891 he attended the Académie Julian in Paris, but after six months returned to Newark.

In the spring of 1893, Nicholson eloped with Mabel Pryde, whom he had by then known for four years; they were married in Ruislip on 25 April. The couple went to live in what had been a pub, the Eight Bells at Denham, Bucks. They were soon joined by Mabel's brother James, and not long after by Ellen Terry's son Edward Gordon Craig and his wife May, who had also recently eloped and married. Nicholson received an annual allowance of £150 from his father.

William and Mabel Nicholson had four children: the celebrated painter Ben (1894–1982); Anthony (1897–1918), who died of wounds in France during the First World War; Annie Mary "Nancy" (1899–1978), artist and wife of the poet Robert Graves; and the architect and designer Christopher "Kit" (1904–1948). Mabel died in July 1918 in the Spanish flu epidemic, and Anthony died soon afterwards.

From about 1910 until he remarried in 1919, Nicholson's housekeeper Marie Laquelle, whose real name was Adèle Marie Schwarz, née Schiestel, was also his mistress. Nicholson painted her several times, first as Carlina in 1909; he also painted her daughter Georgette and her second husband Norman Holder.

In October 1919, Nicholson married Edith Stuart-Wortley, widow of Sir John Stuart-Wortley, and who, under the name Elizabeth Drury, was also a painter. Nicholson had painted her in the previous year as Lady in Grey. Their daughter Liza was born in 1920. Edie had two children from her previous marriage, and Nancy's daughter Jennie had been born the previous year. Nicholson's books for children all date from the 1920s; around this time he lived at the Old Manor House, Sutton Veny, Wiltshire.

From 1935 until his death, Nicholson's companion was the novelist Marguerite Steen. According to Steen, they met in Andalucia in May 1935, and by mid-June were living together at Nicholson's mews studio in Apple Tree Yard, off Jermyn Street. Nicholson had been separated from Edie for some years, but they remained on good terms; although she promised to give him a divorce, she never did so.

In later life, Nicholson lived at Blewbury in Berkshire (now Oxfordshire) where he died on 16 May 1949.

Work

Graphic work

From 1893 to 1898, Nicholson collaborated with his brother-in-law James Pryde on poster design and other graphic work including signboard painting and book illustration. They called themselves the Beggarstaffs, or J. & W. Beggarstaff; in recent times they have been referred to as the Beggarstaff Brothers, although they did not use this name.

Book design and illustration

Nicholson provided illustrations and a cover design for An Alphabet by William Nicholson, An Almanac of Twelve Sports by William Nicholson with words by Rudyard Kipling, and London Types, all three published by William Heinemann in 1898. Two years later came The Square book of Animals by Sir William Nicholson with Rhymes by Arthur Waugh (W. Heinemann, 1900). He also illustrated several of the early books of his son-in-law Robert Graves and The Velveteen Rabbit, a book for children by Margery Williams (1922), and a new edition by Heinemann of John Gay’s Polly (1923). He also wrote and illustrated two books of his own for children, Clever Bill (1926) and The Pirate Twins (1929), both published by Faber & Faber. In 1929 he provided illustrations for a new edition of Siegfried Sassoon’s Memoirs of a Fox-Hunting Man.

Paintings

From about 1900, Nicholson concentrated on painting, encouraged by Whistler. He first exhibited as a painter at the International Society, of which Whistler was President.

Work in other fields
In 1904, he designed the original settings for Peter Pan, and went on to design other plays and to illustrate several books. He also designed stained glass, notably a memorial window at St Andrew's Church, Mells.

Teaching 

Nicholson had a number of pupils, including, in the 1930s, Winston Churchill. Churchill wrote that "I think the person who taught me most about painting was William Nicholson".

Reception

Nicholson was awarded a gold medal in the graphic works section of the Art competitions at the 1928 Summer Olympics in Amsterdam for his Almanach de douze sports 1898, the French edition of the Almanac of Twelve Sports, published 30 years earlier. He was knighted in 1936.

Published works

As author and illustrator
 An Alphabet. London: William Heinemann, 1898.
 Twelve Portraits. London: William Heinemann; [New York]: R.H. R[ussell], 1899.
 Douze portraits Paris: H. Floury, [1899].
 Characters of Romance. London: William Heinemann, New York: R.H. Russell, 1900.
 Twelve Portraits – Second Series. London: William Heinemann; New York: R.H. Russell, 1902.
 Clever Bill. [London]: William Heinemann, [1926].
 The Pirate Twins. [London]: Faber & Faber, [1929].
 The Book of Blokes. [London]: Faber & Faber, [1929].

As illustrator
 An Almanac of Twelve Sports. Verses by Rudyard Kipling, illustrations by William Nicholson. London: William Heinemann, 1897.
 Almanach de douze sports 1898. Illustrations by William Nicholson, text by Octave Uzanne (Kipling's verses were not used in the French edition). Paris: Société française d'éditions d'art, [1898].
 London Types. Quatorzains by William Ernest Henley, illustrations by William Nicholson. London: William Heinemann; New York: R.H. Russell, 1898.
 Tony Drum: a Cockney Boy. Edwin Pugh, ten coloured plates from designs by the Beggarstaff Brothers (five by Nicholson, five by James Pryde). London: William Heinemann; New York: Henry Holt and Company, 1898.
 The Square Book of Animals. Rhymes by Arthur Waugh, illustrations by William Nicholson. London: William Heinemann, 1900 (designed 1896, copyright 1899).
 Oxford, Parts I and II, each containing lithographs by William Nicholson, descriptive notes by Arthur Waugh. London: Stafford Gallery, 1905.
 The Velveteen Rabbit, or, How Toys Became Real. Margery Williams, illustrations by William Nicholson. London: William Heinemann, 1922.

Exhibitions
The principal exhibitions of William Nicholson include:

References

Further reading 
 Andrew Graham-Dixon (29 September 2004). 'William Nicholson by Augustus John' Sunday Telegraph, "In The Picture".
 Helena Moore, Hugh Casson (introduction) (1988). The Nicholsons: A Story of Four People and Their Designs: Ben Nicholson, 1894–1982; Nancy Nicholson, 1899–1977; Kit Nicholson, 1904–1948; E.Q. Nicholson, born 1908, exhibition catalogue. York: York City Art Gallery. .

External links

Modern artists
English illustrators
19th-century English painters
English male painters
20th-century English painters
Knights Bachelor
Olympic gold medalists in art competitions
Place of birth missing
William
1872 births
1949 deaths
People educated at Magnus Church of England School
Académie Julian alumni
People from Newark-on-Trent
People from Blewbury
Medalists at the 1928 Summer Olympics
Olympic competitors in art competitions
20th-century English male artists
19th-century English male artists